Faqih, in Iran, may refer to:
 Faqih Ahmadan
 Faqih-e Hasanan